Verkhozerye is a rural locality (a selo) in Lyakhovskoye Rural Settlement, Melenkovsky District, Vladimir Oblast, Russia. The population was 39 as of 2010. There are 6 streets.

Geography 
Verkhozerye is located on the Urvanovskoye Lake, 30 km southeast of Melenki (the district's administrative centre) by road. Starinki is the nearest rural locality.

References 

Rural localities in Melenkovsky District